"Dame Un Beso" (English translation: "Give Me a Kiss") is a 1986 song by Mexican-American singer Selena, from her third album, Alpha. It was recorded when she was 14 years old. The song was written by A. B. Quintanilla and Ricky Vela, who were both in her band at the time. A. B. Quintanilla, Selena's brother, had grown tired of the more old-fashioned songs that his father would choose and write, and decided to take over and write almost all of her songs.

Soon after its release, Selena, then 15, won the awards for both "Female Vocalist of the Year" and "Performer of the Year" at the Tejano Music Awards.. For that success "Dame Un Beso" was released as a vinyl, LP, and EP in 1986. "Dame Un Beso" has since been released on various of Selena's posthumous greatest-hits compilation albums.

Albums released
These albums have included the song "Dame Un Beso":
 Alpha 1986
 Mis Primeros Éxitos, 1990
 Selena Y Sus Inicios Vol. 1, 2001
 Classic Series, Vol. 1 2007
 Inolvidable, 2009

References

Songs about kissing
1986 songs
Selena songs
Songs written by A. B. Quintanilla
Songs written by Ricky Vela